Brunswick Falls, also known as Pejepscot Falls, is an ancient section of the Androscoggin River, bordering the towns of Brunswick and Topsham, Maine. First occupied by Paleoindians and the Wabanaki Native Americans, the falls were a plentiful resource for food and trade. Throughout Colonial history, the Industrial Revolution, and into the 21st century, the falls have been a vital part of Brunswick and Topsham's economy, harnessing its power for energy development.

Ancient history

Pre-human

25,000 years ago all of New England, including Maine, was covered by the massive Laurentide Ice Sheet. Climate change forced the sheet of ice to start receding, with the last of the glacial ice disappearing from Maine by 10,000 years ago.

Large sand dunes accumulated in this glacial period as winds picked up outwash sand forming river valleys, such as the Androscoggin River. As the climate warmed, the modern stream and river network was soon established, including Brunswick Falls.

The formation of the natural falls consists of granite and Gneiss, with three levels (prior to 1981). The rocks in the middle falls projects above the water at several points, serving as a natural island (Shad Island), to the several sections of the falls.

Indigenous peoples

The first Indigenous peoples of the Americas to inhabit Maine were called Paleoindians by archaeologists, migrating from the former landmass of Beringia. The Paleoindians made part of their living by hunting caribou and fishing for salmon, sturgeon, and shad with their small campsites marked by distinctive stone tools and spread across New England.

The Paleoindians, over several millennia, settled into the area, along the Androscoggin River and eventually became the Wabanaki Native Americans, encompassing what is today, Brunswick, Topsham and Harpswell, Maine. The Wabanaki's called this area of Maine, Pejepscot, and lived there until the 1600s when the first Europeans arrived. During the time of the Wabanaki natives, they embraced the resources of the falls. Pejepscot Falls, as it was then called, was the site of a trading post, that the Wabanaki's established, to exchange furs, with other local Native American tribes.

European settlement

In the year 1628 Thomas Purchase of England was the first European settler to set foot in Pejepscot, building his own trading post, at Pejepscot Falls. Purchase had an agreement with the natives for the land, as long as they were still able to hunt and fish at the falls. Four years later, in 1632, the Plymouth Company granted a patent to the land known as Pejepscot, including the falls, to Purchase and his brother in law, George Way. The Falls had a rich stock of salmon, sturgeon and shad, which Purchase took advantage of, shipping barrels of fish laden with salt, to London.

During the various Native American Wars in the region, there were two fortifications established adjacent to the falls. During King William's War, the first fort was built in 1688; Fort Andross, commanded by Major Thomas Savage and under the authority of the Dominion of New England. During King Philip's War, the second fortification was built in 1715 on the ruins of Fort Andross and was known as Fort George. This fort would be dismantled in 1736 when the Native American wars were coming to an end.

Dams

Throughout the 19th Century, there would be many dams built across the Androscoggin River, in between the towns of Brunswick and Topsham, Maine. The first dam was built in the year 1753 and like all subsequent dams of this century, were carried away from freshets.

Colonel Loammi Baldwin, of Boston, made a survey of the water-power of the Androscoggin River, in Brunswick.

During the Industrial Revolution, there was a multitude of cotton mills that harnessed the water-power of the falls, the most notable being the Cabot Mill Manufacturing Company.

Brunswick Hydroelectric Plant

Sagadahoc Light and Power Company was the first organization to acquire electric power from Brunswick Falls, with a purposes to generate, sell, and distribute electricity for lighting, heating and manufacturing in the towns of Bath and Brunswick. They were acquired by Bath and Brunswick Light & Power Company in 1910, who in turn, was acquired by Central Maine Power on December 31, 1920.

Between 1979 and 1982 construction occurred for the Brunswick Hydroelectric Station, operated by Brookfield Renewable, sending power to Central Maine Power's electrical grid. The dam became the lower most dam on the Androscoggin River at head of tide.

Commercial power generation at Unit 1 began in March 1982. In 1982 construction began on Units 2 and 3 of the Brunswick hydroelectric station including a fish ladder. It was completed in May 1983 .

The station has three generators at work for a total capacity of 20 megawatts. Generator 1, being the largest has a capacity of 13 megawatts and generators 2 and 3 both have a capacity of 3.5 megawatts.

Fishways
Since 1809 when the first cotton mill was erected at the falls, fish have been blocked off by dams from this portion of the Androscoggin River. Salmon, Sturgeon, Alewife and shad were very abundant in the Androscoggin, but their number has greatly diminished during modern times.

In 1871 a substantial stone fishway was made at the middle falls. To construct it, the ledge on the northwest end of the dam was cut through. The fishway was on the Topsham side of the dam, at the lower side. A year later, a wooden fishway was put in on the lower dam next to Shad Island. These were not the first fishways, as early as 1789 the fish wardens were instructed by the town of Topsham to see that the dams were opened so that fish could pass.

While the falls original dams were made from wood and stone, later dams were constructed out of concrete, eliminating the possibility for fish to move upstream. By the 1930s, the Androscoggin's population of sea-run fish was virtually gone, although the Clean Water Act of 1972 helped restore a few species of fish.

Shad, Salmon and Sturgeon are sometimes able to make it up the ladder, but are often beaten or injured along the way.

See also
 Brunswick Historical Society
 Pejepscot Historical Society
 History of Maine

References

External links
 

History of Maine
Dams in Maine
Geography of Maine
Waterfalls of Maine
Hydroelectric power plants in Maine
Pejepscot, Maine